The following is a list of types of poison by intended use:

Biocide –  a chemical substance capable of killing living organisms, usually in a selective way
Fungicide – a chemical compound or biological organism used to kill or inhibit fungi or fungal spores
Microbicide – any compound or substance whose purpose is to reduce the infectivity of microbes
Germicide – a disinfectant
Bactericide – a substance that kills bacteria
Viricide – a chemical agent which "kills" viruses outside the body
Herbicide – a substance used to kill  unwanted plants
Parasiticide – any substance used to kill parasites
Pesticide – a substance or mixture of substances used to kill a pest
Acaricide – pesticides that kill mites
Insecticide – a pesticide used against insects
Molluscicide – pesticides against molluscs
Nematocide – a type of chemical pesticide used to kill parasitic nematodes (roundworms)
Rodenticide – a category of pest control chemicals intended to kill rodents
Spermicide – a substance that kills sperm

References

See also
Toxicity
Antibiotic

Poisons